Dean Bosnich is an Australian former professional rugby league footballer who played in the 2000s for the Cronulla Sharks in the National Rugby League from 2002 until 2004.

Playing career
Bosnich made his debut in round 3 of the 2002 season against the Penrith Panthers. Bosnich played the majority of 2002 including the preliminary final defeat against New Zealand and the first half of 2003 off the Bench, however after the mid-season departure of Dean Treister to Hull FC he gained a starting position for part of the 2003 and 2004 NRL Seasons.

References

Australian rugby league players
Living people
Cronulla-Sutherland Sharks players
1980 births
Rugby league hookers